Vladimir Bajić (Serbian Cyrillic: Владимир Бајић; born 28 November 1987) is a Serbian professional footballer who last played as a goalkeeper for Greek Super League 2 club Niki Volos.

Career
He started his career in Sloga Temerin, and later he played for Mladost Bački Jarak, Srem, Novi Pazar, where he made his SuperLiga debut, and Banat. On 21 July 2013 he joined the Borac Čačak, in Borac Čačak was three seasons.

On July 23, 2016, he signed a 2-year contract with Serbian SuperLiga side FK Radnički Niš.

References

External links
 
 Vladimir Bajić Stats at Utakmica.rs
 

1987 births
Living people
People from Novi Sad
Footballers from Novi Sad
Association football goalkeepers
Serbian footballers
Serbian expatriate footballers
Serbian League players
Serbian First League players
Serbian SuperLiga players
Super League Greece players
Super League Greece 2 players
FK Srem players
FK Novi Pazar players
FK Banat Zrenjanin players
FK Borac Čačak players
FK Radnički Niš players
Levadiakos F.C. players
Athlitiki Enosi Larissa F.C. players
Niki Volos F.C. players
Serbian expatriate sportspeople in Greece
Expatriate footballers in Greece